Fuerstia is a genus of plants in the family Lamiaceae, first described in 1929. It is native to Eastern and Southern Africa.

Species
Fuerstia adpressa A.J.Paton - Angola
Fuerstia africana T.C.E.Fr. - East Africa (Ethiopia, Rwanda, Somalia, Kenya, Uganda, Tanzania)
Fuerstia angustifolia G.Taylor - Tanzania, Angola, Malawi, Zambia 
Fuerstia bartsioides (Baker) G.Taylor - South Sudan
Fuerstia dendrothrix A.J.Paton - Somalia
Fuerstia rara G.Taylor - Angola
Fuerstia rigida (Benth.) A.J.Paton - Angola
Fuerstia ternata A.J.Paton - Tanzania
Fuerstia welwitschii G.Taylor - Angola

References

Lamiaceae
Lamiaceae genera